Yevhen Stadnyk (born April 9, 1976) is a Ukrainian curler.

Teams and events

Mixed doubles

Personal life
Yevhen Stadnyk and his mixed doubles teammate Olena Pazderska live and curl in New Jersey, United States.

References

External links

1976 births
Living people
People from New Jersey
Ukrainian male curlers
American male curlers
Place of birth missing (living people)